Semacode is a software company based in Waterloo, Ontario, Canada. It is also this company's trade name for their machine-readable ISO/IEC 16022 Data Matrix barcodes, which are used to encode Internet URLs.

Semacodes are primarily aimed at being used with cellular phones which have built-in cameras, to quickly capture a Web site address for use in the phone's web browser. Semacodes are in fact DataMatrix encoded URLs.

The Semacode website states that Semacode tags are an "open system" and that tag creation is "completely unrestricted," with the SDK software tools being free of charge for non-commercial use.

Potential uses for Semacode tags are still being explored, and will complement development of the concept of using mobile phones as devices for information gathering and exchange. Suggestions from the Semacode.org website included:

 placing Semacode tags on posters, such as those for concerts and public performances. Those interested could use their mobile phone to take a photo of the tag, which could link them directly to the web page where they could order tickets.
 using Semacode tags and mobile phones to enable multilingual museum exhibits - a tag photographed at the exhibition entrance could set a language cookie in the phone's web browser, and subsequent Semacode tags displayed at each exhibit could then link the phone's browser directly to a web page about the item, displayed in the user's language of choice.
 placing Semacode tags on name tags given to conference attendees. These tags could provide the corporate web address of each attendee's company, or their biography and contact details.

See also

 QR Code an implementation of a similar concept invented in Japan.
 PDF417
 Object hyperlinking
 High Capacity Color Barcode
 SPARQCode
 Cauzin Softstrip an historical implementation of a similar concept introduced in the 1980s

References

External links
 Semacode.com
 Online Semacode/DataMatrix decoder

Barcodes
Companies based in Waterloo, Ontario